Pride's Harvest is a 1991 novel from Australian author Jon Cleary. It was the eighth book featuring Sydney homicide detective Scobie Malone.

Synopsis
Malone is called in to investigate the murder of a Japanese industrialist in the small country town of Collamundra, where his family are holidaying with friends. Scobie becomes involved in local racial tensions and a murder that happened seventeen years ago.

References

External links
Pride's Harvest at AustLit (subscription required)

1991 Australian novels
HarperCollins books
William Morrow and Company books
Novels by Jon Cleary